Aubrey Hubert Hart (4 September 1893 – 24 November 1958) was an Australian rules footballer who played for the St Kilda Football Club in the Victorian Football League (VFL).

Notes

External links 

1893 births
1958 deaths
Australian rules footballers from Victoria (Australia)
St Kilda Football Club players